Norman Scott Brien Gras (1884–1956), known as N. S. B. Gras, was a Canadian professor at the Harvard Business School who invented the academic discipline of business history.

Early life
Gras was born in 1884 in Toronto, Ontario. He graduated from the University of Western Ontario. He went on to receive a PhD in economics from Harvard University.

Career
Gras taught economics at the University of Minnesota.

Gras was appointed as Professor of Business History by Dean Wallace Brett Donham in 1927. He invented this new academic discipline, which only existed as his job title at the time. From the outset, Gras made sure to draw a distinction between economic history and business history. For Gras, economic history failed to focus on the role of the businessman as well as the role of business administration. Instead, the main goal of business history was to highlight those two components in the history of corporations and business developments.

Gras served as the president of the Business History Foundation. He was the founder and editor of the Journal of Economic and Business History. He was also the editor of the Harvard Studies of Business History.

Death
Gras died in 1956.

Works

References

1884 births
1956 deaths
People from Old Toronto
University of Western Ontario alumni
Harvard Graduate School of Arts and Sciences alumni
University of Minnesota faculty
Harvard Business School faculty
Canadian emigrants to the United States
Canadian economists
Business historians
Fellows of the Medieval Academy of America